Rose Aboaje (born 1977) is a Nigerian former sprinter who competed for Nigeria at national and international athletics competitions. She won the bronze and silver medals in the 100 metres and 200 metres events at the 1998 African Championships in Athletics.

International competitions

Personal bests
100 metres – 11.31 (1998)
200 metres – 22.83 (1998)

See also
List of African Championships in Athletics medalists (women)

References

External links

 

Living people
1977 births
Date of birth missing (living people)
Nigerian female sprinters
African Games competitors for Nigeria
Athletes (track and field) at the 1999 All-Africa Games
20th-century Nigerian women
21st-century Nigerian women